Harold David Anderson  (6 September 1923 – 17 June 2020) was an Australian public servant and diplomat.

Early life and career
Anderson was born in the North Adelaide suburb of Semaphore on 6 September 1923, the son of A. H. Anderson of Mount Gambier. He spent his early years and education in Largs Bay and later Mount Gambier, where he attended Mount Gambier High School. At Mount Gambier High School he was dux of his Intermediate year and won the Vansittart Scholarship, which entitled him to three years at St Peter's College, Adelaide. In his final year at the college he won a Bursary to study law at the University of Adelaide. At the end of his first year he gained first position in Latin, receiving the Andrew Scott Prize, and was articled to Charles Abbott KC, who later rose to be Attorney-General of South Australia.

During his second year at university, Andserson enlisted as a Private into the Australian Army on 7 October 1942. While serving in New Guinea in 1944, Anderson sat for the cadetship examination for the new Australian diplomatic service, and was the only South Australian selected, being discharged on 3 June 1944.

Honours
Officer of the Order of Australia (AO), 1980 Australia Day Honours.
Officer of the Order of the British Empire (OBE), 1966 Queen's Birthday Honours.

References

1923 births
Consuls-General of Australia in Noumea
Australian Army personnel of World War II
Ambassadors of Australia to Vietnam
Ambassadors of Australia to France
Permanent Delegates of Australia to UNESCO
Permanent Representatives of Australia to the United Nations
Ambassadors of Australia to Belgium
Ambassadors of Australia to Luxembourg
Ambassadors of Australia to the European Union
People educated at St Peter's College, Adelaide
University of Adelaide alumni
Officers of the Order of Australia
Australian Officers of the Order of the British Empire
2020 deaths
Australian Army soldiers